Julio Castellanos González (b. Mexico City, October 3, 1905 – d. Mexico City, July 16, 1947) was a Mexican painter and engraver.

Biography 
Castellanos matriculated the Escuela Nacional de Bellas Artes in 1918, where he studied under Saturnino Herrán and Leandro Izaguirre, together with Agustín Lazo, Rufino Tamayo and Leopoldo Méndez. Afterwards he studied engraving in the United States, where he met Manuel Rodríguez Lozano, who influenced his work strongly. Back in Mexico, he participated in the open-air painting schools there, and studied drawing under Adolfo Best Maugard. In 1925 he had his first single exhibition in Buenos Aires, and moved to Paris to deal with European art. Returned to Mexico, he joined the Teatro Ulises group, and exhibited six paintings in a Los Contemporáneos' exhibition, that were totally different from his earlier works. His first and only finished two murals he painted at Juan O'Gorman's Escuela Melchor Ocampo (Melchor Ocampo school), Coyoacán, in 1933. A further partly finished mural, he painted in a school in the Colonia Peralvillo of Mexico City, titled 
"El ojo enfermo"(the injured eye). Together with Frida Kahlo, he was awarded by the Secretaría de Educación Pública in 1946, the same year, when his wife Zita Basich Leija gave birth to their son Antonio, today a notable sculptor.

Castellanos exhibited his works in Buenos Aires, Paris and New York City, and participated in several group exhibitions in his home country as well as in the United States. He died shortly after he became director of the department of plastic and fine arts.

Selected works 
 "La cirugía casera", 1932
 "El baño de san Juan", 1939
 self-portrait,1947
 "El día de San Juan"
 "El Bohío Maya"

Literature 
 Olivier Debroise, Julio Castellanos 1905–1947. México, Banco Nacional de México, 1982.

References 

20th-century Mexican painters
Mexican male painters
Mexican muralists
Mexican engravers
People from Mexico City
1905 births
1947 deaths
20th-century engravers
20th-century Mexican male artists